The following is a list of railway stations in Nagaland:

List 
Railway stations in Nagaland along with the station codes:

See also 
 List of railway stations in India

References 

Buildings and structures in Nagaland
Nagaland